In statistics, functional correlation is a dimensionality reduction technique used to quantify the correlation and dependence between two variables when the data is functional. Several approaches have been developed to quantify the relation between two functional variables.

Overview
Since both  and are infinite dimensional, some kind of dimension reduction is required to explore their relationship. Notions of correlation for functional data include the following.

Functional canonical correlation coefficient (FCCA)

FCCA is a direct extension of multivariate canonical correlation. For a pair of random functions  and  the first canonical coefficient  is defined as:

where  denotes the inner product in Lp space (p=2) i.e. 
  

The  canonical coefficient , given  is defined as:

where  is uncorrelated with all previous pairs .

Alternative formulation
,
where  is uncorrelated with all previous pairs 

Maximizing (3) is equivalent to finding eigenvalues and eigenvectors of the operator .

Challenges
As a consequence of this inverse problem, overfitting may occur which may lead to an unstable correlation coefficient. Due to this inverse problem,  tends to be biased upwards and therefore close to 1 and hence is difficult to interpret. FCCA also requires densely recorded functional data so that the inner products in (2) can be accurately evaluated.

Possible solutions
Some possible solutions to this problem have been discussed.

 By restricting the maximization of (1) to discrete  sequence spaces  that are restricted to a reproducing kernel Hilbert space instead of entire 
 Using cross-validation to regularize the FCCA in practical implementation.

Functional singular correlation analysis (FSCA)

FSCA bypasses the inverse problem by simply replacing the objective function by covariance in place of correlation in (2). FSCA can be viewed as an extension of analyses using singular-value decomposition of vector data to functional data.

which is attained at functions . A standardized version of this serves as a functional correlation and is defined as
,
The singular representation of the cross-covariance can be employed to find a solution to the maximization problem (4).
Analogously, we can extend this concept to find the next  ordered singular correlation coefficients .

Correlation as angle between functions 
This can be extended to the space of square integrable random functions. For this notion to be a meaningful measure of alignment of shapes, the integrals of the functions, which are the projections on the constant function 1, are subtracted. This part corresponds to a "static part" and the remainder can be thought of as a "dynamic part" for each random function. The cosine of the  angle between these "dynamic parts" then provides a correlation measure of functional shapes. Denoting  and  the standardized curves may be defined as 
 and the correlation is defined as,

See also 
 Functional data analysis
 Functional principal component analysis
 Karhunen–Loève theorem
  Functional regression
 Generalized functional linear model
 Stochastic processes
 Canonical correlation

References

Covariance and correlation